Boadilla Centro is a station on Line 3 of the Metro Ligero in Madrid, Spain. It is located in fare Zone B2.

References 

Madrid Metro Ligero stations
Buildings and structures in Boadilla del Monte
Railway stations in Spain opened in 2007